Salloum Kaysar is a Lebanese former cyclist. He competed in the individual road race event at the 1980 Summer Olympics.

References

External links
 

Year of birth missing (living people)
Living people
Lebanese male cyclists
Olympic cyclists of Lebanon
Cyclists at the 1980 Summer Olympics
Place of birth missing (living people)